National Vegetation Classification could refer to:

 the British National Vegetation Classification (NVC)
 the U.S. National Vegetation Classification (NVC or USNVC)